Edmund Smith Conklin (April 19, 1884 – October 6, 1942) was an American author and psychologist.

He was born in New Britain, Connecticut on April 19, 1884. He attended Clark University when G. Stanley Hall was a leading teacher. He graduated in psychology from Springfield college and Clark University. He was a professor and chairman of the department of psychology at Indiana University. He served at various times as visiting professor at the University of Chicago and Syracuse University. He wrote books on abnormal psychology, anomalistic psychology and the psychology of religion.

He died in a hospital in Bloomington, Indiana on October 6, 1942.

Publications
Introductory Psychology for Students of Education [with Frank Samuel Freeman] (1939) 
Three diagnostic Scorings for the Thurstone Personality Schedule (1937)
Outline of Abnormal Psychology (1936)
Principles of Adolescent Psychology (1935)
The Scale of Values Method for Studies in Genetic Psychology (1923)
Principles of Abnormal Psychology (1927, 1944)
The Foster-Child Fantasy (1920)
Collegiate Religious Education (1909)

References

1884 births
1942 deaths
20th-century American psychologists
Anomalistic psychology
Writers from New Britain, Connecticut
Clark University alumni
University of Chicago faculty
Indiana University faculty
Syracuse University faculty